Romanoa tamnoides is a species of plant of the family Euphorbiaceae. It is the sole species in the monotypic genus Romanoa, first described in 1824. It is native to Brazil and Paraguay.

Varieties
 Romanoa tamnoides var. sinuata (Ule) Radcl.-Sm. - Bahia
 Romanoa tamnoides var. tamnoides - Paraguay, SE Brazil (Minas Gerais, Goiás, Rio de Janeiro)

The genus name Romanoa is also used for a fungus.

References

Plukenetieae
Plants described in 1824
Flora of South America